Kvíslavatn is a lake in Iceland. The lake is situated in the Highlands of Iceland to the west of Sprengisandur highland road and to the south-east of the glacier Hofsjökull. Its surface area is about 20 km2.

See also
List of lakes of Iceland

External links
Photo

Lakes of Iceland